Aethriscus is a genus of Central African orb-weaver spiders first described by Reginald Innes Pocock in 1902.  it contains only two species, both found in Middle Africa.

References

Araneidae
Araneomorphae genera
Spiders of Africa
Taxa named by R. I. Pocock